Red Sucker Tunnel is a railway tunnel in geographic McCoy Township in the town of Marathon, Thunder Bay District in northwestern Ontario, Canada. It is located on the north shore of Lake Superior at Red Sucker Cove, and was constructed in 1884 for the Canadian Pacific Railway (CPR) by contractor Kenneth McLeod.

References 

Map sources:

Atlas of Canada. Map sheet 042D16 - Goodchild Lake. Retrieved 2016-02-05

External links
Picture of the tunnel at the McCord Museum

Canadian Pacific Railway tunnels
Railway tunnels in Ontario
Tunnels completed in 1884
1884 establishments in Ontario